Congress Voting Independence is a painting by Robert Edge Pine showing the interior of Independence Hall in Philadelphia. It includes portraits of most of the signers of the United States Declaration of Independence. The artist worked on the painting from 1784 until his death in 1788. The painting is unfinished. It currently is held in Independence Hall, Philadelphia.

Identification of portraits 
Most of the portraits can be identified.  
The central figures, left to right, are John Adams of Massachusetts, Roger Sherman of Connecticut, Robert R. Livingston, Thomas Jefferson of Virginia, and Benjamin Franklin (seated), the members of the Committee of Five which drafted the declaration.

In the foreground on the left is Samuel Adams of Massachusetts and Robert Morris of Pennsylvania (wearing white).  Above Samuel Adams is Robert Treat Paine of Massachusetts and above him is Dr. Benjamin Rush of Pennsylvania.  Immediately to the left of Samuel Adams is Samuel Chase.  Above Robert Morris wearing dark is Benjamin Harrison.

Engraving by Edward Savage 
An engraving based on the painting was made by Edward Savage in 1801, who finished the unpainted portraits.

See also
 Declaration of Independence, painting by John Trumbull, 1818
 Founding Fathers of the United States

References 
http://www.nps.gov/history/museum/exhibits/revwar/image_gal/indeimg/congress.html
http://www.loc.gov/exhibits/declara/declara4.html
Hart, "Congress Voting Independence," Pennsylvania Magazine of History and Biography 29 (1905): 1-14.

External links 
http://www.nps.gov/history/museum/exhibits/revwar/image_gal/indeimg/congress.html

American paintings
1780s paintings
Portraits of men
Portraits of politicians
18th-century portraits
United States Declaration of Independence in art
History paintings
Paintings about the American Revolution
Unfinished paintings
Cultural depictions of John Adams
Cultural depictions of Samuel Adams
Cultural depictions of Thomas Jefferson
Cultural depictions of Benjamin Franklin